Roger Trevor Peter Miller (born 23 October 1972 in Southampton, Hampshire) is a former English cricketer. Miller was a right-handed batsman who bowled right-arm medium pace.

Miller made his List-A debut for the Hampshire Cricket Board against Suffolk, in 1999. From 1999 to 2002 Miller represented the Board eight times, with his last List-A match coming against Staffordshire in the 2nd Round of the 2003 Cheltenham & Gloucester Trophy which was played in 2002.

Miller took eight wickets for the Board at a bowling average of 36.37, with best figures of 3/26. With the bat Miller scored 128 runs at an average of 21.33, with a best score of 34.

Between 1992 and 1997 Miller represented the Hampshire Second XI in the Second Eleven Championship eight times.

External links
Roger Miller at Cricinfo
Roger Miller at CricketArchive

1972 births
Living people
Cricketers from Southampton
English cricketers
Hampshire Cricket Board cricketers